Agnes Ludwig Riddle (born 1865 in Silesia - died 5 May 1930 in Englewood, Colorado) was an American politician who served as a member of the Colorado House of Representatives from 1911 to 1914 and in the Colorado Senate from 1917 to 1920. She was the first woman to serve in both chambers of the Colorado General Assembly.

She opposed legislation to create a state police force.

In 2022, she was inducted into the Colorado Women's Hall of Fame.

See also
Timeline of women's suffrage in Colorado

References 

Members of the Colorado House of Representatives
Colorado state senators
1865 births
1930 deaths